The 2014 FIA World Endurance Championship season was the third season of the FIA World Endurance Championship auto racing series, co-organized by the Fédération Internationale de l'Automobile (FIA) and the Automobile Club de l'Ouest (ACO). The series was open to Le Mans Prototypes and grand tourer-style racing cars from four ACO categories. World Championship titles were awarded for Le Mans Prototypes drivers and for LMP1 manufacturers, and several World Endurance Cups and Endurance Trophies were also awarded. The eight race series began in April at the Silverstone Circuit and concluded in November at the Autódromo José Carlos Pace.

The World Endurance Championship for Drivers was won by Toyota Racing pairing Anthony Davidson and Sébastien Buemi, as they won four of the season's eight races. Davidson and Buemi finished as champions by 39 points, ahead of Audi Sport Team Joest trio Marcel Fässler, André Lotterer and Benoît Tréluyer, who won successive races at Le Mans and the Circuit of the Americas. Ten points further behind in third place, was the Porsche Team's Romain Dumas, Neel Jani and Marc Lieb. With their victory in São Paulo, Dumas, Jani and Lieb gained the tie-break over Audi Sport Team Joest's Lucas di Grassi and Tom Kristensen. The season's other event was won by the sister Toyota team of Mike Conway, Stéphane Sarrazin and Alexander Wurz in Bahrain, while Nicolas Lapierre was a part of the winning team at Silverstone and Spa with Davidson and Buemi. With five wins, Toyota won the World Endurance Championship for Manufacturers, 45 points ahead of Audi. Rebellion Racing won the two privateer trophies on offer for the LMP1-L cars, winning all eight races; five wins for the No. 12 entry of Mathias Beche, Nick Heidfeld and Nicolas Prost, with three wins for the sister No. 13 entry of Andrea Belicchi, Dominik Kraihamer and Fabio Leimer.

Consistent finishing within the LMP2 class was enough to give the No. 27 entry from SMP Racing the FIA Endurance Trophy for the class, while Sergey Zlobin won the drivers' championship. Despite only winning at Le Mans – which awarded double points, where he was partnered with Anton Ladygin and Mika Salo – Zlobin, achieved six podium finishes with four different teammates and won the championship by nine points. G-Drive Racing, with drivers Julien Canal, Olivier Pla and Roman Rusinov won four races, but retirements at Le Mans and São Paulo ultimately denied them the titles. Similarly, seven points further in arrears, KCMG with drivers Richard Bradley and Matthew Howson won three races but also suffered two retirements at Le Mans and Shanghai. Tsugio Matsuda (Circuit of the Americas) and Alexandre Imperatori (Bahrain and São Paulo) were also part of winning KCMG teams, but did not contest the whole season.

In the GT element of the series, the World Endurance Cup was won by AF Corse and drivers Gianmaria Bruni and Toni Vilander. Bruni and Vilander took 4 victories during the season, and finished 33.5 points clear of the next best driver Frédéric Makowiecki, driving for Porsche Team Manthey. Makowiecki won twice during the season, winning with Marco Holzer and Richard Lietz at Silverstone, and with Patrick Pilet in Shanghai. Lietz and Pilet finished third and fourth in the standings respectively. The only other winners in the GT standings as a whole, was Aston Martin Racing at the Circuit of the Americas and São Paulo, with drivers Stefan Mücke and Darren Turner. In the Endurance Trophy for LMGTE Pro teams standings, AF Corse finished 20 points clear of Porsche Team Manthey. In the separate sub-classifications for the LMGTE amateur class, Aston Martin Racing won seven out of the eight races, to take a 1–2 in the teams' championship. In the drivers' championship, David Heinemeier Hansson and Kristian Poulsen won the title with four wins and four second places. They finished 34 points clear of the sister entry of Paul Dalla Lana, Pedro Lamy and Christoffer Nygaard, who won a trio of races. Third place went to Nicki Thiim, 20 points further adrift, who was a part of the Heinemeier Hansson-Poulsen entry at 5 events. The season's other winners were AF Corse at Spa, with drivers Marco Cioci, Luís Pérez Companc and Mirko Venturi.

Calendar
A provisional calendar was published by the FIA World Endurance Championship on 20 September 2013. All eight races remained from the 2013 schedule, although with some dates changed. On 18 October, the calendar was revised to avoid some collisions with Formula One races. At the World Motor Sport Council meeting on 4 December 2013 the FIA confirmed the 2014 schedule. The round at Fuji Speedway took place on 12 October, avoiding a clash with the United SportsCar Petit Le Mans, and the provisional round at Interlagos was confirmed. The schedule was revised again on 31 January 2014, moving the São Paulo round to 30 November to avoid clashes with Formula One.

The rounds at the Circuit of the Americas and the Bahrain International Circuit both finished in night-time conditions.

Entries
The FIA unveiled an entry of 31 cars for the 2014 season of the World Endurance Championship, divided into five categories: Le Mans Prototype 1-Hybrid (LMP1-H), 1-Lightweight (LMP1-L), and 2 (LMP2), and Le Mans Grand Touring Endurance Professional (LMGTE Pro) and Amateur (LMGTE Am).

LMP1-H
LMP1-H became the unique category for the factory prototype teams in 2014 after the LMP1 category was split in two. Audi returned with a revised R18, led by the defending World Champion duo of Tom Kristensen and Loïc Duval, joined by Lucas di Grassi.  2012 World Champions Benoît Tréluyer, Marcel Fässler, and André Lotterer were in the sister Audi, while a third car also entered the Spa and Le Mans rounds. Toyota also returned with an all-new TS040 while retaining the same drivers from their past two seasons. Porsche expanded their World Endurance Championship effort beyond LMGTE with their all-new 919, bringing with them a collection of factory drivers, former Formula One driver Mark Webber, and newcomer to the championship Brendon Hartley.

LMP1-L
The new LMP1-L category, designed solely for privateers without hybrid systems in their cars, featured two-time winners of the FIA Endurance Trophy for Private LMP1 Teams, Rebellion Racing.  The team developed two all-new Toyota-powered R-One chassis, but started the season with their familiar Lolas while they awaited the completion of the R-Ones. Fabio Leimer of Switzerland became the new rookie on the team, replacing Neel Jani, who was promoted to the Porsche factory team.  The Kodewa-backed Lotus team moved up from the LMP2 category with their new CLM P1/01 with a new engine in the World Championship from British firm Advanced Engine Research (AER). However, Lotus missed the season's first three races as the car was not yet ready.

LMP2
The LMP2 class, nine strong in 2013, saw a significant reduction in its entrant list for 2014, with defending LMP2 champions OAK Racing downsizing their operation to a single Morgan entry, taking over the Russian G-Drive title that came with driver Roman Rusinov, before being replaced mid-season by OAK's newer Ligier JS P2 model.  Russian outfit SMP Racing, in conjunction with AF Corse, shifted from the European Le Mans Series with their pair of Orecas, while Hong Kong-based team KCMG moved from the Asian Le Mans Series with a solo Oreca, after running invitational entries in the WEC in 2013.  Greaves Motorsport returned to the European Le Mans Series for 2014 after two years in the WEC, while PeCom Racing's LMP2 effort was dissolved. Delta-ADR and Fabien Giroix, formerly of Gulf Racing Middle East, merged their teams under the Millennium Racing name, but the two-car entry withdrew from the series prior to the first round due to financial problems. Strakka Racing announced a switch from the LMP1 category to co-develop an LMP2 coupé with Japanese manufacturer Dome, the S103.  However, Strakka's 2014 program was delayed and eventually cancelled after issues with developing the car evolved.

LMGTE Pro
Much remained the same in the LMGTE Pro category, with Porsche, Aston Martin, and AF Corse Ferrari each with two full-season cars. Davide Rigon was promoted within AF Corse following the departures of Giancarlo Fisichella and Kamui Kobayashi, while Frédéric Makowiecki switched allegiances from Aston Martin to Porsche. Fernando Rees, LMGTE Am champion in 2012 with Larbre Compétition, was promoted to LMGTE Pro alongside Darryl O'Young and Alex MacDowall, with their World Touring Car Championship team Bamboo Engineering, associated with Aston Martin to lead one of the company's entries.  British privateers Ram Racing moved to the World Endurance Championship after their 2013 European Le Mans Series LMGTE title led by Matt Griffin and Álvaro Parente in the first of the team's Ferraris. However, the team withdrew from the series after Le Mans.

LMGTE Am
Defending LMGTE Am champions 8 Star returned with their Ferrari, picking up Proton Competition's Paolo Ruberti and Gianluca Roda to co-drive with team owner Enzo Potolicchio. They were joined in the Ferrari camp by AF Corse as well as Ram Racing's second Ferrari, which was also withdrawn after Le Mans. Proton Competition upgraded their Porsche to the 2013-specification 911 RSR, while series newcomers Prospeed Competition bolstered Porsche's efforts. Aston Martin also retained their dual amateur entries, with 2013 LMP2 championship runner-up David Heinemeier Hansson moving to the all Danish squad. Krohn Racing returned to the United States for the United SportsCar Championship, while IMSA Performance entered the European Le Mans Series. 2012 LMGTE Amateur Endurance Trophy winners Larbre Compétition switched to the European Le Mans Series, competing in LMP2; the team had the intention to take part in the WEC rounds following the 24 Hours of Le Mans, but later backed out of these plans.

Results and standings

Race results
The highest finishing competitor entered in the World Endurance Championship is listed below.  Invitational entries may have finished ahead of WEC competitors in individual races.

Entries were required to complete the timed race as well as to complete 70% of the overall winning car's race distance in order to earn championship points. A single bonus point was awarded to the team and all drivers of the pole position car for each category in qualifying. For the 24 Hours of Le Mans, the race result points allocation was doubled. Furthermore, a race must complete three laps under green flag conditions in order for championship points to be awarded.

Drivers' Championships
Five titles were awarded to drivers in the 2014 season. A World Championship was reserved for LMP1 and LMP2 drivers. A World Cup was available for drivers in the LMGTE categories. Further, three FIA Endurance Trophies were also awarded to drivers in the LMP1-L, LMP2 and LMGTE Am categories.

World Endurance Drivers' Championship

World Endurance Cup for GT Drivers

LMP1 Private Teams Drivers' Trophy

FIA Endurance Trophy for LMP2 Drivers

FIA Endurance Trophy for LMGTE Am Drivers

Manufacturers' Championships
Two manufacturers' championships were held in the FIA WEC, one for sports prototypes and one for grand tourers. The World Manufacturers' Championship was only open to manufacturer entries in the LMP1 category, while the World Cup for GT Manufacturers allowed entries from both LMGTE Pro and LMGTE Am to participate.  Both titles allowed the top two finishing cars from each manufacturer to earn points toward their total.

World Endurance Manufacturers' Championship

World Endurance Cup for GT Manufacturers

Teams championships
Teams in each of the FIA WEC categories, with the exception of LMP1-H, were eligible for their own FIA Endurance Trophies. Each entry, regardless of team, was scored separately.

FIA Endurance Trophy for Private LMP1 Teams

FIA Endurance Trophy for LMP2 Teams

FIA Endurance Trophy for LMGTE Pro Teams

FIA Endurance Trophy for LMGTE Am Teams

References

External links

 

FIA World Endurance Championship seasons
 
World Endurance Championship